The 1913 Club Atlético Boca Juniors season was the squad's debuting season in Argentine Primera División, the top division of the Argentine league system, after having been promoted by the Argentine Football Association on February 10, along with Banfield, C.A. Comercio, Estudiantil Porteño, Ferrocarril Sud, Olivos, Platense, and Riachuelo.

Boca Juniors' debut in Primera was on April 13 v Estudiantil Porteño, a 4–2 win as visitor with 3 goals scored by Arnulfo Leal. Boca Juniors finished 5th. at its first season in Primera División, playing a total of 14 matches. The team won 8, lost 4 and drew 2, scoring 29 goals and conceding 16. In 1913 Boca also played the first official match v arch-rival River Plate, known as Superclásico, held in Estadio Racing Club, and being won by River Plate by 2–1.

By that time, Boca had been evicted from the field in Dársena Sud so the team played their home venues at Club Atlético Estudiantes stadium located in Palermo for most part of the championship, also playing at Riachuelo stadium the last matches. With its debut in Primera División, Boca Juniors also introduced its classic horizontal gold band instead of the diagonal design used until then.

Squad 

 (c)

Matches 
 = Won;  = Drew;  = Lost

Primera División 
After the schism in Argentine football of 1912, there were two parallel competitions, the official league (where Boca Juniors played, formed by 15 teams) and dissident Federación Argentina de Football (with 10 teams competing). Boca Juniors finished 5th. to champion Racing Club, with 18 points in 14 matches.

Final standings

Other competitions

Copa de Competencia Jockey Club 
Additional source: 

Boca Juniors was eliminated

Friendly matches

Statistics

Players statistics

Notes

References 

Club Atlético Boca Juniors seasons
1913 in association football